Ceronapril (INN, proposed trade names Ceranapril, Novopril) in a phosphonate ACE inhibitor that was never marketed.

References 

ACE inhibitors
Carboxamides
Enantiopure drugs
Phosphonates
Prodrugs
Pyrrolidines